Next at the Kennedy Center is a new PBS television series which produces episodes that present and contextualize performances at The Kennedy Center.  These episodes spotlight "cultural leaders from the worlds of hip hop, jazz, folk, comedy, modern dance and more." It is produced by the Kennedy Center. The show debuted on PBS on October 14, 2022, with the episode "Let My Children Hear Mingus".

Groups or organizations featured or retrospectively featured include: Charles Mingus, Joni Mitchell, The Roots. Five episodes have been produced in the first season.

Episodes

References

External links
 
PBS: Next at the Kennedy Center
The Kennedy Center: Next at the Kennedy Center

PBS original programming
English-language television shows